Koshkonong is an unincorporated community located in the towns of Koshkonong, Jefferson County and Milton, Rock County, Wisconsin, United States.

History
A post office called Koshkonong operated between 1839 and 1935. The community took its name from nearby Lake Koshkonong.

Notes

Unincorporated communities in Jefferson County, Wisconsin
Unincorporated communities in Rock County, Wisconsin
Unincorporated communities in Wisconsin